Newbold–White House is a historic house in Hertford, Perquimans County, North Carolina.

The brick house was built in 1730 by Abraham Sanders, a Quaker who purchased the property in 1726. His plantation on the Perquimans River produced corn, cotton, wheat, flax, indigo, tobacco, rice, and wood products. It is the oldest house in North Carolina that is open to the public.

The house was added to the National Register of Historic Places in 1971.

See also
 List of the oldest buildings in North Carolina

References

External links
 Official website
 

Historic American Buildings Survey in North Carolina
Houses on the National Register of Historic Places in North Carolina
Houses completed in 1685
Museums in Perquimans County, North Carolina
Historic house museums in North Carolina
National Register of Historic Places in Perquimans County, North Carolina
Houses in Perquimans County, North Carolina
1685 establishments in North Carolina
Plantation houses in North Carolina